Dium or Dion was a town of Pisidia mentioned by Stephanus of Byzantium Its location is unknown.

References

Populated places in Pisidia
Former populated places in Turkey
Lost ancient cities and towns